Agrimoniinae is a subtribe of the rose family, Rosaceae. It is the sister to subtribe Sanguisorbinae in tribe Sanguisorbeae. It includes the Afromontane endemics Hagenia and Leucosidea.

References
 As PDF

 
Sanguisorbeae
Plant subtribes